The 2020–21 Kerala Premier League season was the eighth season of the Kerala Premier League. The season featured 12 teams which was divided into 2 groups and were played on a home-and-away format. The season was originally scheduled to start in 2020, but was postponed to 2021 due to Covid-19 Pandemic. It began on 6 March 2021 across two centralised venues in Thrissur and Kochi. This season, Kerala Football Association decided to add two more participants into the league. KSEB and BASCO were the new entrants into the league.

Teams

Foreign players
Clubs can sign maximum Three players   two is allowed in the playing eleven.

Group stage

Group A

Fixtures and results
Source: 
 Cancelled Matches

Group B

Fixtures and results
Source: 
 Cancelled Matches

Knockout stage

Semi-finals

Final

References

Kerala Premier League seasons
Kerala Premier League